The canton of Vauréal is an administrative division of the Val-d'Oise department, Île-de-France region, northern France. It was created at the French canton reorganisation which came into effect in March 2015. Its seat is in Vauréal.

It consists of the following communes:

Aincourt
Ambleville
Amenucourt
Arthies
Avernes
Banthelu
Bray-et-Lû
Buhy
La Chapelle-en-Vexin
Charmont
Chaussy
Chérence
Cléry-en-Vexin
Condécourt
Courdimanche
Frémainville
Genainville
Guiry-en-Vexin
Haute-Isle
Hodent
Longuesse
Magny-en-Vexin
Maudétour-en-Vexin
Menucourt
Montreuil-sur-Epte
Omerville
La Roche-Guyon
Sagy
Saint-Clair-sur-Epte
Saint-Cyr-en-Arthies
Saint-Gervais
Seraincourt
Théméricourt
Vauréal
Vétheuil
Vienne-en-Arthies
Vigny
Villers-en-Arthies
Wy-dit-Joli-Village

References

Cantons of Val-d'Oise